Salindres is a commune in the Gard department in southern France. The composer and conductor Roger Dumas (1897–1951) was born, in Salindres.

Geography

Climate

Salindres has a hot-summer Mediterranean climate (Köppen climate classification Csa).

Population

See also
Communes of the Gard department

References

Communes of Gard